Karlo Letica (born 11 February 1997) is a Croatian professional footballer who plays as a goalkeeper for Romanian Liga I club Hermannstadt.

Club career

Hajduk Split and lower division loans
Letica kicked off his career with Hajduk Split in 2015 after arriving to the academy in 2008. He spent the initial years in loan spells. His first loan spell came in February 2015, when he joined Mosor of the third tier along with five other Hajduk players. His second loan spell was to NK Val of the same tier. In August 2016, he was loaned off again, this time to second tier club Rudeš where he made his debut in the Croatian Football Cup qualifiers.

In August 2017, Letica made his debut for Hajduk when he featured in a 1–0 league victory against Slaven Belupo where he kept a clean sheet. On 11 March 2018, Letica scored his first professional goal in injury time against Istra 1961 for a 3–2 victory.

Club Brugge
On 15 June 2018, Letica moved abroad and signed a four-year contract with Belgian club Club Brugge.

SPAL (loan)
On 20 August 2019, Letica joined Italian Serie A club SPAL on loan with an option to buy.

Sampdoria (loan)
On 5 October 2020, Letica joined Italian Serie A club Sampdoria on loan with an option to buy.

CFR Cluj
On 11 October 2021, he moved to Romania to sign with defending Liga I champions CFR Cluj.

Hermannstadt
On 12 October 2022, Letica joined Romanian Liga I club Hermannstadt agreeing to a one-year deal , with an option to extend for a further year.

International career 
Letica was a part of the Croatia U19 team that played in 2016 UEFA European Under-19 Championship. In August 2017, he was called to the Croatia U21 fot matches against Moldova and Austria. He made his debut against Austria which ended in a 1–1 draw.

In May 2018 he was named in the Croatia national team's preliminary 32-man squad for the 2018 World Cup in Russia, but did not make the final 23.

Career statistics

Honours
Club Brugge
 Belgian Super Cup: 2018

CFR Cluj
 Liga I: 2021–22

References

External links

Hajduk Split profile

1997 births
Living people
Footballers from Split, Croatia
Association football goalkeepers
Croatian footballers
Croatia youth international footballers
Croatia under-21 international footballers
NK Mosor players
NK Rudeš players
HNK Hajduk Split players
Club Brugge KV players
S.P.A.L. players
U.C. Sampdoria players
CFR Cluj players
FC Hermannstadt players
Second Football League (Croatia) players
Croatian Football League players
First Football League (Croatia) players
Belgian Pro League players
Serie A players
Liga I players
Croatian expatriate footballers
Croatian expatriate sportspeople in Belgium
Croatian expatriate sportspeople in Italy
Croatian expatriate sportspeople in Romania
Expatriate footballers in Belgium
Expatriate footballers in Italy
Expatriate footballers in Romania